Swimming is an event at the Island Games, the biennial multi-sports event for island nations, territories and dependencies. Swimming at the Island Games started in 1985 and has been a sport in the games on every occasion since then. Minimum age to compete is 13

Events
As of 2019, the swimming events at the 1985 Island Games were swum in a 33m pool. All other games that were hosted had swimming events in 25m short course swimming pools.

Top Medalists
NGR New Games Record

Men's 50m
Top Medalists

Results

Men's 100m
Top Medalists

Results

Men's 200m

Top Medalists

Results

Men's 400m

Top Medalists

Results

Men's 1500m

Top Medalists

Results

Men's Relay Team

Top Medalists

Results

Mixed Relay Team

Top Medalists

Results

Women's 50m

Top Medalists

Results

Women's 100m

Top Medalists

Results

Women's 200m

Top Medalists

Results

Women's 400m

Top Medalists

Results

Women's 800m

Top Medalists

Results

Women's Relay Team

Top Medalists

Results

References

External links 
iiga.org - Swimming
natwestiowresults2011.com - Games Records
natwestiowresults2011.com - Isle of Man - Swimming
iiga.org - NatWest Island Games XII - Rhodes 2007

 
Sports at the Island Games
Island Games